The 1923 Lehigh Brown and White football team was an American football team that represented Lehigh University as an independent during the 1923 college football season. In its second season under head coach James A. Baldwin, the team compiled a 6–2–1 record and outscored opponents by a total of 107 to 57. The team played its home games at Taylor Stadium in Bethlehem, Pennsylvania.

Schedule

References

Lehigh
Lehigh Mountain Hawks football seasons
Lehigh football